Clash: Artifacts of Chaos is a 2023 action-adventure video game developed by ACE Team and published by Nacon. The game is the third installment in the Zeno Clash series.

Plot
The story of Clash: Artifacts of Chaos takes place in Zenozoik, the fantasy setting of Zeno Clash and Zeno Clash 2. The protagonist is a martial artist named Pseudo who becomes the bodyguard of the Boy, a small creature with healing powers desired by the tyrant Gemini and her henchmen.

Gameplay
Like the previous titles of the series, the gameplay of Clash: Artifacts of Chaos is centered around unarmed melee combat. While its two predecessors used exclusively a first-person perspective during gameplay sequences, the third installment plays mostly in third-person perspective. First person is limited to brief sequences which can lead to the execution of finisher attacks.

Combat against intelligent beings can be preceded by a round of the Ritual, a dice game that grants a tactical advantage to the winner from a range of options, such as an extra ally or a fog cloud opaque only to the adversary.

For the first time in the series, the game features a character customization system including attributes to increase when leveling up and combat stances to unlock, such as the Spear stance which grants long reach attacks.

Another innovation to the series is the maze-like world design: instead of maps divided by loading screens, Clash: Artifacts of Chaos takes place in a semi open world inspired by Bloodborne.

Development
The game was announced at the Nacon Connect online press conference in July 2021 with a release originally scheduled for June 2022, but was postponed to November 2022, then February 9, 2023, and later March 9, 2023.

Clash: Artifacts of Chaos uses a unique cross-hatched rendering filter which gives it a hand-painted pencil style.

After a first collaboration with ACE Team on SolSeraph and The Eternal Cylinder, The Talos Principle writer Jonas Kyratzes has been involved in the development of Clash: Artifacts of Chaos.

A free demo was distributed at the Steam Next Fest of October 2022 and at the ID@Xbox Winter Game Demo Event.

References

2023 video games
ACE Team games
Video games developed in Chile
Action-adventure games
Beat 'em ups
3D beat 'em ups
Martial arts video games
Fantasy video games
Open-world video games
PlayStation 4 games
PlayStation 5 games
Unreal Engine games
Video game sequels
Windows games
Xbox One games
Xbox Series X and Series S games